

Laidunina Lighthouse (Estonian: Laidunina tuletorn) is a lighthouse located in Kahtla Peninsula, Laimjala Parish, on the island of Saaremaa, in Estonia. The lighthouse was built in 1907, built out of brick with a gallery and a one-story hexagonal stone base. The lantern was removed, with the lighthouse being deactivated in 1924. The lighting equipment was transferred to Kübassaare Lighthouse. The lighthouse was recognised as cultural monument of Estonia in 2005.

See also 

 List of lighthouses in Estonia

References

External links 
 Estonian lighthouses list Maritime Administration (in Estonian)

Lighthouses completed in 1907
Resort architecture in Estonia
Lighthouses in Estonia
Saaremaa Parish
Buildings and structures in Saaremaa
Tourist attractions in Saare County